Desjardin is one of the longest-running French metal packaging manufacturers, founded in 1848.

Desjardin may also refer to:

 Dennis Desjardin, mycologist who has identified many fungi species, for example Callistosporium vinosobrunneum
 Jacques Desjardin (or Desjardins; 1759-1907), French general of the Royal Army
 Rita Desjardin, a fictional character from the 1974 Stephen King novel Carrie
 Thomas A. Desjardin (born 1964), American historian

See also 
 Dejardin (disambiguation)
 Desjardins (disambiguation)